Cliff Warren (born March 8, 1968) is an American college basketball coach who is currently an assistant coach for the SMU Mustangs. He previously served as the head coach for Jacksonville University.

Playing career
Born in Silver Spring, Maryland, Warren played collegiately at Mount St. Mary's University from 1986 to 1990. Warren was a two-year starter for the Mountaineers, where he finished his career ranked in the top five in assists and top 50 in scoring in the school record book. As a senior in 1989-90, he averaged 10.4 points and 5.0 assists per game, while leading The Mount to its first winning season at the Division I level.

Assistant coach
Warren returned to his alma mater in 1994 to take his first coaching job as an assistant under Jim Phelan.

Warren then served from 1997 to 2000 as an assistant at Siena under Paul Hewitt. Warren spent five years under Paul Hewitt at Georgia Tech. Warren was a part of the coaching staff that led the Yellow Jackets to the 2004 national championship game, losing to UConn.

Jacksonville University
Warren was hired as head basketball coach at Jacksonville University in 2005, following the retirement of legendary coach Hugh Durham.

Warren's first year at Jacksonville saw the Dolphins finish the season with only eight healthy players. They struggled to a 1–26 record, the worst performance in school history. In Warren's second year, the Dolphins pulled off the biggest turnaround in the country – improving from one win to a 15-14 record and a third-place finish in the Atlantic Sun Conference.

The Dolphins reached the finals of the 2008 Atlantic Sun men's basketball tournament, losing to Belmont.

The following year, the Dolphins won their first Atlantic Sun Conference regular-season basketball championship. They also made their first trip to the postseason since 1987 as the Dolphins received an automatic bid to the NIT.

In 2009-10, the Dolphins returned to the NIT and faced the top-seeded Arizona State Sun Devils in the first round. Jacksonville knocked off the Sun Devils on a 3-pointer by guard Ben Smith with 1.5 seconds left. It gave the Dolphins their first postseason win in eight games going back to the 1974 NIT. Jacksonville also reached 20 wins for the first time since 1986.

In 2010-11, the Dolphins finished with a 20-12 overall record, earning wins over Auburn and Florida. The Dolphins had back-to-back 20-win seasons for the first time since 1973-74. They were invited to the 2011 CollegeInsider.com Tournament, Jacksonville defeated East Carolina before falling to SMU in the second round.

After a 12-18 season in 2013-14, Warren's contract was not renewed by Athletic Director Brad Edwards. He was 126-150 and 89-79 in the Atlantic Sun Conference in nine seasons at the helm of the Dolphins.

Team USA

Warren was an assistant coach for Team USA at the 2011 FIBA Under-19 World Championship.

Head coaching record

References

External links
Bio on Jacksonville's athletics site

1968 births
Living people
American men's basketball coaches
American men's basketball players
Basketball coaches from Maryland
Basketball players from Maryland
Georgia Tech Yellow Jackets men's basketball coaches
Jacksonville Dolphins men's basketball coaches
Maryland Terrapins men's basketball coaches
Mount St. Mary's Mountaineers men's basketball coaches
Mount St. Mary's Mountaineers men's basketball players
People from Silver Spring, Maryland
Siena Saints men's basketball coaches
Sportspeople from Montgomery County, Maryland
UMass Minutemen basketball coaches